Özbek may refer to:

Places in Turkey
 Özbek, Çanakkale
 Özbek, Kulp
 Özbek, Şabanözü
 Özbek, Urla

People with the surname
 Aysun Özbek (born 1977), Turkish volleyball player
 Barış Özbek (born 1986), Turkish-German footballer
 Rifat Ozbek (born 1953), Turkish fashion designer
 Setenay Özbek (born 1962), Turkish writer
 Ufuk Özbek (born 1992), Turkish footballer

Turkish-language surnames